Rev. John Norman Maclean (1862–1941) was a Scottish-Canadian Presbyterian minister who emigrated to the United States and served in congregations in California, Iowa, and Montana. 

Rev. Maclean is best known as the father of American author Norman Maclean. Norman Maclean wrote vividly about his family in both fictionalized and non-fictional accounts, including the bestseller, A River Runs Through It, which remains an iconic work of 20th century American literature.

Early life
John Norman Maclean was born to Norman Maclean and Mary MacDonald Maclean on the homestead cleared by his grandparents after emigrating from the Isle of Coll to the Canadian Gaelic-speaking community of Marshy Hope, Nova Scotia on July 28, 1862.

Showing early signs of academic promise, John Norman Maclean trained for the ministry first at Pictou Academy, where academic records refer to him as "J.N. Mclean of Glenbard", a community famous as the last home and burial place of the Canadian Gaelic poet John MacLean, the former Chief Bard to the Chief of Clan MacLean of Coll, who remains a major figure in Scottish Gaelic literature.

He completed his education at Dalhousie College in Halifax and at Manitoba College in Winnipeg. While riding circuit in the summers among small Presbyterian congregations in the pioneer farming communities of the Pembina Valley Region of south-central Manitoba, Maclean met his future wife, an English-Canadian schoolmarm named Clara Davidson.

Ordination and marriage
Clara's father, John Davidson, was a Presbyterian immigrant from Northern England, and had settled first near Argenteuil, Laurentides, Quebec, where his daughter Clara had been born. Finding the farm land there to be poor, however, John Davidson and his family had moved west by oxcart and settled on a homestead at New Haven, near Manitou, Manitoba.

During their courtship, Clara often accompanied John while he was riding circuit. In 1893, John Norman Maclean completed advanced studies at San Francisco Theological Seminary in San Anselmo, California and was ordained as a Presbyterian minister. John and Clara Maclean were married in Pembina, Manitoba on August 1, 1893.

Personal life
John and Clara Maclean had two sons, both of whom graduated from Dartmouth College. The eldest son Norman Maclean, was born at Clarinda, Iowa in 1902 and went on to become a professor at the University of Chicago and a highly regarded figure in 20th century American literature. 

The younger son, Paul Davidson MacLean, became well-known as an investigative journalist in both Helena, Montana and in Depression era Chicago. Paul Maclean suffered from alcoholism and gambling addiction, in addition to being a brawler and chronic womaniser. Despite repeated offers of help by his family, Paul MacLean rejected all such overtures. 

On the early morning of May 2, 1937, Paul Maclean was attacked and brutally beaten at Sixty-Third Street and Drexel Avenue in Chicago by two men who, according to one eyewitness, drove away afterwards in a car. Paul MacLean was taken to nearby Woodlawn Hospital, where he died, without regaining consciousness, at 1:20 pm that same afternoon. According to his brother Norman, Paul Maclean fought back against his attackers and sold his life dearly. So much so,in fact, that all the bones in his right hand were found to have been broken during his last fight. 

Following a homicide investigation by Detective Sergeant Ignatius Sheehan, the Chicago Police Department ruled Paul Maclean's murder to be a mugging gone bad. Another theory at the time was that Paul MacLean was murdered over his inability or refusal to pay an illegal gambling or loansharking debt owed to the Chicago Outfit. No arrests were ever made and the case remains officially unsolved, however.

With his father's encouragement, Norman wrote a slightly fictionalized account of their childhood and last summer together with their parents in A River Runs Through It which was published in 1976 and later adapted into a film.

In 1908 the Rev. John Norman Maclean moved to Missoula, Montana and became pastor of the First Presbyterian Church of Missoula in 1909.

Death and legacy
Maclean died in 1941. In 2009 First Presbyterian Church in Missoula dedicated a monument to honor Rev. Maclean.

In popular culture
 In Robert Redford's award-winning 1992 film adaptation of Norman Maclean's autobiographical novella, Rev. John Norman Maclean was portrayed onscreen by actor Tom Skerritt.

References

1862 births
1941 deaths
20th-century Presbyterian ministers
American Presbyterian ministers
American people of Scottish descent
Canadian Presbyterian ministers
Clan Maclean
People from Missoula, Montana
People from Pictou County